Stacey-Ann Smith (born January 8, 1991) is a female sprinter who currently represents the United States of America. She recently represented Team USA at the 2014 Penn Relays USA vs The World 4x100 relay which won the silver medal.  Stacey was also selected for the 2014 USA World Relay Team for the 4x100 meter relay. A graduate of and the University of Texas where Smith was a 4 Time All American Sprinter. In 2010 Smith finished 4th in the World Junior Championship 400m final and was part of the Gold Medal winning US relay team. Smith has a personal best of 23.27 for the 200m and 52.83 for the 400m.

Smith also represented the University of Texas for Soccer.

References

American female sprinters
1991 births
Living people
21st-century American women